West Lakes Shore is a suburb in the Australian state of South Australia located in the Adelaide metropolitan area about  north-west of the Adelaide city centre and about  west of the municipal seat of Woodville.

West Lakes Shore is located in the federal division of Hindmarsh, the state electoral district of Lee and the local government area of the City of Charles Sturt.

History

West Lakes Shore and its larger sister suburb West Lakes were created from the low-lying wasteland and coastal sand dunes formerly known as "The Greater Port Adelaide Development Area".   In 1969 an Indenture was signed by the South Australian Government and the Delfin Group for the joint development of this area which measures 4.83 km long and 1.6 km wide.

Since that time West Lakes and West Lakes Shore have become a thriving community of 8,800 people enjoying sporting, shopping, educational and recreational facilities in a fully planned development renowned nationally for its excellence in planning and design.

West Lakes Shore Post Office opened on 21 May 1997 replacing the nearby Semaphore Park office.

People

The total population of West Lakes Shore at the 2006 Census was 2965.
 
In the  the population comprised 48.5% males and 51.5% females.

Children aged between 0 –14 years accounted for 12.2% of the total population, while 36.0% were persons aged 55 years and over.

The median age was 47 years compared to the national median age of all Australians of 37 years.

The vast majority (74.8%) of the residents were born in Australia, with 6.4% born in England and 2.3% in Italy.

Landmarks

The major landmarks in the suburb include:
West Lakes Shore R-7 School
SA Rowing and Aquatic Centre
The lake - West Lakes
West Lakes Shore Beach
West Lakes Uniting Church
Bartley Terrace Shopping Centre
The parks, including Neighbourhood Reserve, Jubilee Reserve (known locally as Hawkesbury Reserve), and Heysen Reserve
Bartley Tavern
West Lakes Shore Oval.  The clubs that use this oval are
West Lakes Sports Club Inc 
SMOSH West Lakes Football Club Inc
Henley & Grange Baseball Club Inc
Port Adelaide Softball Club Inc

Schools and recreation
West Lakes Shore R-7 School is located on Edwin Street and caters for children from Reception to Year 7.

West Lakes Sports Club Inc, located on the East side of Bartley Tce was established in 2002 and is home to the Henley & Grange Baseball Club, SMOSH West Lakes Senior and Junior Football Club, Port Adelaide Softball Club, Current Affairs Group and the West Lakes Social Club, and is also available to the public for functions and dining.

Club West Lakes (previously known as The Lakes Sports and Community Club) was built in 1986 and is home to the West Lakes Bowling Club, Tennis Club, and Croquet Club.  Combined it has over 800 members.

RowingSA and the West Lakes Aquatic Centre are based on the lakefront, alongside Military Road.  Each year during March, the Centre hosts the annual Head of the River Carnival.

With access to the waters of West Lakes and with generally flat terrain, various sporting organisations conduct triathlons around the streets and in the lake.  Usually these triathlons are held in the autumn months.

References

Suburbs of Adelaide